The Riverside Historic District is a national historic district located in southwest Baltimore, Maryland.  It encompasses 1,997 contributing buildings between Federal Hill and Locust Point.  The district includes notable examples of Greek Revival and Late Victorian style architecture.

It was listed on the National Register of Historic Places in 2008.

Scenes from the Alfred Hitchcock film Marnie were shot in Riverside on Sanders Street where it intersects with Riverside Avenue.

References

External links

, including undated photo and boundary map, at Maryland Historical Trust

Southwest Baltimore
Greek Revival architecture in Maryland
Victorian architecture in Maryland
Historic districts on the National Register of Historic Places in Baltimore
Riverside, Baltimore